Chepino can refer to several places in Bulgaria:
 the Chepino Valley in the Rhodopes
 Chepino, a neighbourhood of Velingrad
 Chepino, a village in Pernik Province
 Chepino Saddle in Antarctica